"Reminiscin" is a 2001 song by the musician Ella Mae Saison, featuring CeCe Peniston. The song partially mixed in the France as well New York City, was sponsored by a multiple world champion boxer, Evander Holyfield, and released in April on his own record label named after his nickname "Real Deal". After being classified as the Billboard Hot Dance Breakout number one for the category of Maxi-Singles Sales (on August 4), the song hit number thirty in the Billboard Hot Dance Music/Club Play chart on August 11, 2001.

Credits and personnel
 Ella Mae Saison – lead vocal, writer
 CeCe Peniston – lead vocal, writer
 Matthias "Matty" Heilbronn – mix, arranger, producer
 Rick Pierre O'Neil – mix, producer
 NCP Studios, New York City – studio, mix
 RPO Traxx Studio, France – studio, mix

Track listings and formats
 12", US, #757667063410
 12", US, #7576670634-10

 "Reminiscin" (RPO Vocal Mix) - 6:32
 "Reminiscin" (Matty's Soulflower Mix) - 8:47
 "Reminiscin" (Matty's Deep Dub) - 9:02
 "Reminiscin" (RPO Dub) - 6:42

 MCD, US, #757667063427
 MCD, US, Promo, #757667063427
 "Reminiscin" (LP Version) - 5:57
 "Reminiscin" (RPO Vocal Mix) - 6:32
 "Reminiscin" (RPO Dub) - 6:42
 "Reminiscin" (Matty's Soulflower Mix) - 8:47
 "Reminiscin" (Matty's Deep Dub) - 9:02
 "Reminiscin" (Matty's II Deep Club Mix) - 8:47
 "Reminiscin" (Matty's II Deep Beats) - 5:13
 "Reminiscin" (RPO Instrumental Dub) - 6:41

Charts

Weekly charts

References

General

 Specific

External links 
 
 

2001 singles
CeCe Peniston songs
Songs written by CeCe Peniston
2001 songs